Pultenaea skinneri, commonly known as Skinner's pea, is a species of flowering plant in the family Fabaceae and is endemic to the south-west of Western Australia. It is a slender shrub with simple leaves, and yellow, red and orange flowers with red markings.

Description
Flowering occurs from July to September and the fruit is a flattened pod.

Taxonomy
Pultenaea skinneri was first formally described by botanist Ferdinand von Mueller in 1874 in Fragmenta Phytographiae Australiae, from specimens collected by Mary Ann McHard near the Blackwood River in south-western Western Australia. McHard collected over 2,000 specimens, now conserved in the National Herbarium of Victoria. The specific epithet, (skinneri), honours George Skinner, an employee of the Victorian Government Printer, where the Fragmenta was published.

Distribution and habitat
Skinner's pea grows in winter-wet depressions in the Jarrah Forest, Swan Coastal Plain and Warren biogeographic regions in the south-west of Western Australia.

Conservation status
This pea is classified as "Priority Four" by the Government of Western Australia Department of Biodiversity, Conservation and Attractions, meaning that is rare or near threatened.

References

External links
Pultenaea skinneri Occurrence data from Australasian Virtual Herbarium

Fabales of Australia
Taxa named by Ferdinand von Mueller
Flora of Western Australia
Plants described in 1874
skinneri